A string of cash coins (Traditional Chinese: , ,) refers to a historical Chinese, Japanese, Korean, Ryukyuan, and Vietnamese currency unit that was used as a superunit of the Chinese cash, Japanese mon, Korean mun, Ryukyuan mon, and Vietnamese văn currencies. The square hole in the middle of cash coins served to allow for them to be strung together in strings. The term would later also be used on banknotes and served there as a superunit of wén.

In Japan and Vietnam the term  would continue to be used until the abolition of cash coins in those respective countries.

Because the strings were often accepted without being checked for damaged coins and coins of inferior quality and copper alloys, these strings would eventually be accepted based on their nominal value rather than their weight; this system is comparable to that of a fiat currency. Because the counting and stringing together of cash coins was such a time-consuming task, people known as  would string cash coins together in strings of 100 coins, of which ten would form a single . The  would receive payment for their services in the form of taking a few cash coins from every string they composed. The number of coins in a single string was locally determined, as in one district a string could consist of 980 cash coins, while in another district this could only be 965 cash coins. During the Qing dynasty the  would often search for older and rarer coins to sell these to coin collectors at a higher price.

The number of cash coins which had to be strung together to form a string differed both from region to region as time period or by the materials used to manufacture the cash coins. For example, under the reign of the Tự Đức Emperor of the Nguyễn dynasty, one string of cash coins included 600 zinc coins, while during the later days of the French colonial period, a string of cash coins was 500 copper alloy coins. In Vietnam a string of cash coins had the nominal value of 1 Mexican peso or 1 French Indochinese piastre. The  system allowed a nominal debt of 2 wén which could be paid out using only one physical cash coin instead of two. In this system a string of Beijing cash coins required only 500 cash coins as opposed to the majority of China, which used 1000 cash coins for a string. During the Qing dynasty period, the term  was used to designate long strings while the term  was used to design short strings. 

Although the term appeared frequently on banknotes, the only cash coin to have ever had the currency unit "String of cash coins" as a part of its inscription was the Nguyễn dynasty-era Tự Đức Bảo Sao 1  cash coin, which was worth 600 văn (or 60 mạch).

Background 

Strings of cash coin units during the Qing dynasty  

During the Qing dynasty different number of cash coins were used to make up strings of cash coins. 

 1  = 1000 wén 

 1 metropolitan  = 1000 metropolitan cash
 1 metropolitan  = 500 pieces of "standard cash coins" (before 1853)
 1 metropolitan  = 50 pieces of "big cash coins" (after 1861) 

In actual circulation, however, cash coins throughout Chinese history were put on strings in ten groups of (supposedly) one hundred coins each; these strings were separated by a knot between each group. During the Qing dynasty period, strings of cash coins rarely actually contained 1000 cash coins and usually had something like 950 or 980 or a similar quantity; these amounts were due to local preferences rather than being random in any form. In the larger cities cash shops would make specific strings of cash coins for specific markets. The cash shops existed because at the time there were many different kinds of cash coins circulating in China, including old Chinese cash coins from previous dynasties, Korean cash coins, Japanese cash coins, Vietnamese cash coins, large and small genuine Qing dynasty cash coins, and different kinds of counterfeits, such as illegally private-minted cash coins. Some of these strings would contain exclusively genuine Zhiqian, while other strings could contain between 30% and 50% of counterfeit and underweight cash coins. The actual number of cash coins on a string and the percentage of counterfeits in a string was generally known to everyone who resided in that town by the type of knots that were used. Each of these different kind of strings of cash coins fulfilled different functions. For example, one string of cash coins was acceptable to be used in a local grain market, while it would not be accepted at a meat market, while another type of string was able to be used in both markets but not to pay taxes. The cash shops sorted all cash coins into very specific categories, then would make up appropriate kinds of strings that were intended for use in specific markets or to pay taxes to the government.

Banknotes 
 

During the Song dynasty the first series of standard government Jiaozi notes were issued in 1024 with denominations like 1  (or 700 wén), 1  (or 1000 ), up to 10 . In 1039 only banknotes of 5  and 10  were issued, and in 1068 a denomination of 1  was introduced which became forty percent of all circulating Jiaozi banknotes. The Huizi also continued to use these currency units. The exchange rate between Guanzi banknotes and copper cash coins was 1  for 770 wén while Huizi notes of the eighteenth production period were valued at 3  for 1 . As the Mongols continued marching south, the Chinese military required more money causing the government to print an excessive amount of Huizi banknotes. The  currency unit would later also be used by the Jurchen Jin dynasty and the Mongol Yuan dynasty on their Jiaochao banknotes, though due to hyperinflation these currencies would not be able to be exchanged with any real cash coins and under Mongol rule non-paper forms of currency were abolished.

Most of these  banknotes had a value of 10  (10,000 mon, or 10 strings of 1000 copper coins), these notes also circulated among the general public.

Under the Ming dynasty the Da-Ming Baochao would also continue using  as a currency unit for its denominations. The 1  Da-Ming Baochao banknote was originally good for 1,000 copper-alloy cash coins and had a size of 36.4×22 cm, making it the largest Chinese paper banknote ever produced. In the middle of its design was an image of a string of cash coins to show what it was worth. Despite originally circulating concurrently with cash coins, the Da-Ming Baochao became a fiat currency and would later no longer be able to be exchanged for any actual cash coins.

The denominations used on them varied greatly with some reaching as high as 5 .

Bamboo tallies 

Some Chinese bamboo tallies, which circulated in the provinces of Jiangsu, Zhejiang, and Shandong from the 1870s until the 1940s, used "strings of cash coins" as a currency unit, but also contained additional inscriptions stating that they would not be paid out in "regular" cash coins. This bamboo tally would then be paid out in a string of 100  of 10 .

Below their denominations many bamboo tallies had the Chinese characters  ('warranty mark') to indicate that the bamboo tally is trustworthy to be worth its stated (nominal) value.

It could then contain an inscription like "" ('a string of 200 cash coins') that would only have to be paid out in a string of 20 cash coins of 10  rather than 200 cash coins of 1 . The issuing authorities would do this due to the concept of "token" money that the Chinese employed at the time. As the Qing dynasty's government started manufacturing Daqian since the Xianfeng period that contained high nominal values but had intrinsic values that were only slightly more valuable than the low denomination coinages, the issuer of the bamboo tally would be able to make a profit off of this situation. This was because the bamboo tally in question would be valued more than the promised redeemed value.

In general, bamboo tallies in the region were not always redeemed and would continue to circulate in their local areas as a type of alternative currency as long as the local populace would maintain their trust that the bamboo token had value or worth.  This situation translated to the profits of issuing the tally being kept by the issuing authority. And if the bamboo tally were to be redeemed, the redeemer would receive a weight of bronze or brass much lower than the bamboo tally's nominal value.

(weight unit) 

The  (Japanese , alternatively  ) as a Japanese unit of measurement is a bead weight for cultured pearls.  equals one thousand  or 3.75 kg. The modern  was officially established in the Japanese Law of Weights & Measures of 1891. It is still used worldwide as a weight indicator for cultured pearls.

Contemporary Western commentaries on strings of cash coins

Qing dynasty 

American bicyclist William Sachtleben visited the city of Ghulja in 1892 and was preparing to cycle to Beijing; while preparing for his trip together with the Russian consul, he noted the difficulty in transporting strings of cash coins, stating:

Sachtleben noted how there were no money exchange banks in the Chinese interior. Of the ability to use and exchange the cash coins Sachtleben noted:

Eventually Sachtleben and the Russian consul managed to exchange the strings of cash coins for silver coins as they were easier to carry on their trip, but noted how the money that they had to carry was much heavier than their camera equipment.

British explorer Isabella Bird wrote of the annoyance that strings of cash coins caused to the Chinese she witnessed in her travels stating:

Nguyễn dynasty (French Indochina) 

During the colonial era in French Cochinchina, Chinese sapèques (known as lý) were exclusively used as casino tokens by gambling houses and were not used for other purchases unless trade was being conducted with Qing China. The general conversion rate was 1000 lý = 1 lạng = 7.50 French francs. The  which circulated at the time of French Cochinchina were made from zinc and had a very distinctive square centre hole allowing for them to be strung into strings of 1000 zinc  or 600 copper-alloy . Each string is further subdivided into 10  consisting of 60 ; these coins were valued in their quantity rather than in weight. These coins usually featured the reign or era title of the reigning Nguyễn monarch and were extremely poorly manufactured with bad alloys, causing the strings to often break. Many  broke, resulting in considerable losses for their owners due to their brittleness.

To the French, zinc coinage also presented a huge inconvenience since their colonisation of Cochinchina in 1859, as the exchange between French francs and zinc Tự Đức Thông Bảo  meant that a large amount of zinc coins were exchanged for the French franc. Zinc cash coins often broke during transportation as the strings that kept them together would often snap. The coins would fall to the ground and a great number of them would break into pieces. These coins were also less resistant to oxidation, causing them to corrode faster than other coinages.

Prior to 1849 brass coins had become an extreme rarity and only circulated in the provinces surrounding the capital cities of Vietnam, but under Tự Đức, new regulations and (uniform) standards for copper cash coins were created to help promote their usage. Between 1868 and 1872 brass coins were only around 50% copper and 50% zinc. Due to the natural scarcity of copper in Vietnam, the country always lacked the resources to produce sufficient copper coinage for circulation.

Galleries

Strung cash coins

Strings of cash coins used as a currency unit on banknotes

Slang names  

Notes

References

Sources 
 
 Wilkinson, Endymion, Chinese History: A Manual. (Revised and Enlarged). Harvard-Yenching Institute Monograph Series, 52. Harvard University Asia Center. 2000.

 

Coins of ancient China
Chinese numismatics
Cash coins